Bloomer High School is a public school serving grades 9 through 12 in Bloomer, Chippewa County, Wisconsin, United States.

Officials
District Administrator: Mary Randall
Athletic Director: Jason Steinmetz

References

External links
Bloomer School District
City of Bloomer

Public high schools in Wisconsin
Schools in Chippewa County, Wisconsin